Polygono is a neighbourhood of Athens, Greece. In contrast to surrounding areas, it is not as densely populated, owing to a ban on the construction of multi-storey buildings. 

The courts for Athens are located in this district.

The name of the area derives from a polygonal platform which once used to be set up for parades, opposite what are now the courthouses. The ancient name of the area was Anchesmos. The area is also sometimes referred to as Gypareika, due to the fact that Pavlos Gyparis, personal guard to Eleftherios Venizelos once owned a property there. For this reason, the area is also sometimes known as "Eleftherios Venizelos' neighbourhood" and its central park is named after him.

References

External links
 http://www.gtp.gr/LocPage.asp?id=61110

Neighbourhoods in Athens